"The Hole" is a song written by Skip Ewing and James Dean Hicks, and recorded by American country music singer Randy Travis.  It was released in June 1998 as the second single from his album You and You Alone.  It peaked at number 9 on the Hot Country Singles & Tracks (now Hot Country Songs) chart, and number 4 in Canada.

Background
Co-producer James Stroud told Billboard Magazine that when Randy went to sing the song for the first time in front of a room full of Nashville players, "his voice just filled the room. And when we stopped, these great professional musicians stood up and gave him a standing ovation. I have never seen that done in this town before. Never."

Content
"The Hole" is a song describing a man who is burdened by his sins, which are compared to a hole in the ground. He is described as digging the hole deeper in a futile attempt to get out: "Now he won't let go of the shovel, and he can't dig out of the hole."

Music video
The music video was directed by Joe Murray, who also directed Randy Travis's previous video "Out of My Bones".

Use in media
The song was featured in the 1998 movie Deep Impact.

Chart performance
"The Hole" debuted at number 72 on the U.S. Billboard Hot Country Singles & Tracks for the week of June 13, 1998.

Year-end charts

References

1998 singles
Randy Travis songs
Songs written by Skip Ewing
Song recordings produced by Byron Gallimore
Song recordings produced by James Stroud
Song recordings produced by Randy Travis
DreamWorks Records singles
Songs written by James Dean Hicks
1998 songs